Federico Ondo Obama Ondo (born 4 February 2000), also known as Fede, is an Equatoguinean professional footballer who plays as a fullback for Tercera División club CD Acero. He has been a member of the Equatorial Guinea national team. He also holds Spanish citizenship.

Professional career
Fede moved to Spain at a young age from Equatorial Guinea, and raised in Móstoles. Fede joined the youth academy of Atlético Madrid in 2008. In 2012, he played for the under–12 team of the Community of Madrid.

International career
Fede, at the age of 17, was called up to the senior Equatorial Guinea national football team in August 2017. He made his debut on 3 September 2017, starting in a 2-1 friendly loss to Benin. The match was eliminated from FIFA records, as the referee and his assistants referees were from Equatorial Guinea. As it was a friendly which besides was not recognized by FIFA, Fede remains eligible to Spain (as a naturalized citizen).

Personal life
Fede's twin brother, Salomón Obama, is an Equatoguinean professional footballer who plays as a forward for Emirati First Division League side Dibba Al-Fujairah Club and the Equatorial Guinea national team.

References

External links
Atlético Madrid profile 

2000 births
Living people
Sportspeople from Malabo
Equatoguinean footballers
Association football fullbacks
Equatorial Guinea international footballers
Fang people
Twin sportspeople
Equatoguinean twins
Equatoguinean emigrants to Spain
Naturalised citizens of Spain
Spanish footballers
Footballers from the Community of Madrid
Atlético Madrid footballers
Tercera División players
Spanish twins